Samy Kehli (born 27 January 1991) is a French professional footballer who currently plays as a midfielder. He is currently playing for Racing FC in the Luxembourg National Division.

Career

Kehli began his career in the reserve team at Metz, and made his debut in the Championnat de France amateur 2 in the 3–0 home win against Jarville on 9 May 2010. He entered play as a 60th-minute substitute for Mehdi Bousbaa and scored the team's final goal four minutes from time. He made a second substitute appearance three weeks later as Metz won 1–0 away at Pontarlier. He played several more matches for the reserve side during the first half of the 2010–11 campaign. On 29 January 2011 he made his debut for the senior team, coming on as a substitute for Yeni Ngbakoto in the 1–2 defeat away at Troyes. He was then handed his first professional start the following week in the 2–1 away win over Vannes. He went on to play in 11 Ligue 2 matches for Metz during the 2010–11 season, five of them as a substitute.

Kehli made his first appearance of the 2011–12 season in the opening-day defeat away at Tours on 27 July 2011. He played in a further seven league matches during the first five months of the campaign, including a starting place in the 1–0 home win over Reims.

Personal life
Kehli is of Algerian descent.

Career statistics

References

External links
Samy Kehli profile at FootNational

1991 births
Living people
People from Saint-Avold
French footballers
French sportspeople of Algerian descent
Association football midfielders
French expatriate footballers
Expatriate footballers in Belgium
French expatriate sportspeople in Belgium
Expatriate footballers in Luxembourg
French expatriate sportspeople in Luxembourg
Ligue 2 players
Belgian Pro League players
Challenger Pro League players
Luxembourg National Division players
FC Metz players
R.E. Virton players
K.S.V. Roeselare players
K.S.C. Lokeren Oost-Vlaanderen players
Oud-Heverlee Leuven players
Racing FC Union Luxembourg players
Sportspeople from Moselle (department)
Footballers from Grand Est